The Zerynthiini are a tribe of swallowtail butterflies.

Genera
The tribe is thought to consist of four genera:

 Allancastria
 Bhutanitis
 Sericinus
 Zerynthia

References

 Nazari et al. (2007) Phylogeny, historical biogeography, and taxonomic ranking of Parnassiinae (Lepidoptera, Papilionidae) based on morphology and seven genes. Molecular Phylogenetics and Evolution. 42(1):131–156. PDF

External links
 

Papilionidae
Taxa named by Augustus Radcliffe Grote
Butterfly tribes